Back from the Gig is a double LP by American jazz saxophonist Booker Ervin featuring performances recorded in 1963 and 1968 but not released on the Blue Note label until 1976. The earlier session was later released in 1988 as originally intended under Horace Parlan's name as Happy Frame of Mind and the later session was finally released in 2005 as Tex Book Tenor.

Reception
The Allmusic review by Scott Yanow awarded the album 4½ stars and stated "The stimulating group originals and advanced solos (which fall somewhere between hard bop and the avant-garde) still sound fresh and frequently exciting".

Track listing
All compositions by Booker Ervin except as indicated
Side One
 "Home Is Africa" (Ronnie Boykins) -  8:46
 "A Tune for Richard" -  6:06
 "Back from the Gig" (Horace Parlan) - 5:52
Side Two   
 "Dexi" (Johnny Coles) - 5:54
 "Kuchenza Blues" (Randy Weston) - 5:39
 "Happy Frame of Mind" (Horace Parlan) - 6:13
Side Three
 "Gichi" (Kenny Barron) - 7:27
 "Den Tex" - 7:38
 "In A Capricornian Way" (Woody Shaw) - 5:52
Side Four    
 "Lynn's Tune" - 6:16
 "204" - 10:21
Recorded at Rudy Van Gelder Studio, Englewood Cliffs, NJ on February 15, 1963 (Side One and Side Two) and June 24, 1968 (Side Three and Side Four).

Personnel
Booker Ervin - tenor saxophone
Kenny Barron (Side Three and Side Four), Horace Parlan (Side One and Side Two) - piano
Johnny Coles (Side One and Side Two), Woody Shaw (Side Three and Side Four) - trumpet
Grant Green - guitar (Side One and Side Two, tracks 1 & 3)
Jan Arnet (Side Three and Side Four), Butch Warren (Side One and Side Two) - bass
Billy Higgins - drums

References 

Blue Note Records albums
Booker Ervin albums
1976 albums
Albums recorded at Van Gelder Studio